Partners is a 2009 American independent crime film written, directed and produced by Peter James Iengo.

Plot
Two NYPD detectives, Christopher Perez (Christopher Iengo) and his partner Steve Clarkson (Adam Piacente), take on Peskin (Aaron Katter), a vicious drug lord.

Reception
On March 13, 2018, Partners was featured in RedLetterMedia's popular YouTube video review series Best of the Worst. The film was the second entry in RedLetterMedia's Best of the Worst Hall of Fame.

References

External links 
 
 

2009 crime drama films
2009 films
2009 independent films
American crime drama films
American independent films
American police detective films
Fictional portrayals of the New York City Police Department
Films about the New York City Police Department
Films set in Brooklyn
Films shot in New York (state)
2000s English-language films
2000s American films